Dai Sijie (born 1954) is a Chinese French author and filmmaker.

Early life
Dai was born in Putian, Fujian, in 1954. His parents, Professor Dai Baoming and Professor Hu Xiaosu, were professors of medical sciences at West China University. He grew up extensively reading and thinking. Dai excels in many things, including being a skilled tailor. The Maoist government sent him to a re-education camp in rural Sichuan from 1971 to 1974 during the Cultural Revolution. Though as the only child in the family he would have been excused, he went there with the idea of undergoing the spartan training. Much of this experience was the source of his first book.  After his return, he completed his professional certificate as a teacher. He briefly taught in the No. 16 High School of Chengdu upon his enrolling to the Department of History of Sichuan University in February 1978 (so-called 77 grader), where he studied art history.

Career
In 1984, Dai left China for France on a scholarship to study at the Institut des hautes études cinématographiques. There, he acquired a passion for movies and became a director. Before turning to writing, he made three critically acclaimed feature-length films: China, My Sorrow (1989) (original title: Chine, ma douleur), Le mangeur de lune (Moon Eater) and Tang, le onzième (The Eleventh Child).  He also wrote and directed an adaptation of his novel, Balzac and the Little Chinese Seamstress, released in 2002. He lives in Paris and writes in French.

Dai's novel, Par une nuit où la lune ne s'est pas levée (Once on a Moonless Night), was published in 2007. L'acrobatie aérienne de Confucius (The Aerial Acrobatics of Confucius) was published in 2008.

Novels
Dai's first book, Balzac et la petite tailleuse chinoise (Balzac and the Little Chinese Seamstress) (2000), was made into a movie in 2002, which he himself adapted and directed. It recounts the story of a pair of friends who become good friends with a local seamstress while spending time in a countryside village where they have been sent for "re-education" during the Cultural Revolution (see Down to the Countryside Movement). They steal a suitcase filled with illegal Western classical novels from another man being re-educated, and decide to enrich the seamstress's life by exposing her to great literature. These novels also serve to sustain the two companions during this difficult time. The story principally deals with the cultural universality of great literature and its redeeming power. The novel has been translated into twenty-five languages, and finally into his mother tongue after the movie adaptation.

Dai's second book, Le Complexe de Di (The Di Complex) won the Prix Femina for 2003. It recounts the travels of a Chinese man whose philosophy has been influenced by French psychoanalytic thought. The title is a play on "le complexe d'Oedipe", or "the Oedipus complex". The English translation (released in 2005) is titled Mr. Muo's Traveling Couch.

Works

Books 
 Balzac et la petite tailleuse chinoise (Balzac and the Little Chinese Seamstress) (2000)
 Le Complexe de Di (Mr. Muo's Traveling Couch) (2003) (Prix Femina)
 Par une nuit où la lune ne s'est pas levée (Once on a Moonless Night, translated by Adriana Hunter) (2007)
 L’Évangile selon Yong Sheng (The Gospel According to Yong Sheng) (2019)

Filmography as director
 Le paon de nuit (2015)
 Les filles du botaniste (The Chinese Botanist's Daughters) (2006)
 Balzac et la petite tailleuse chinoise (Balzac and the Little Chinese Seamstress) (2002) (France)
 Tang le onzième (The Eleventh Child) (1998) (France)
 Le mangeur de lune (Moon Eater) (1994)
 Chine, ma douleur (China, My Sorrow) (1989) (Prix Jean Vigo)

References

Citations

Sources 

 "Dai Sijie." Contemporary Authors Online, Gale, 2011. Biography in Context, link.galegroup.com/apps/doc/H1000149472/BIC1?u=ivytech20&xid=4891c7a9. Accessed 16 Apr. 2017.

External links 
 

1954 births
Living people
People from Putian
Sent-down youths
20th-century French novelists
21st-century French novelists
Prix Femina winners
Chinese emigrants to France
Film directors from Fujian
French film directors
Screenwriters from Fujian
Male screenwriters
French male novelists
Chinese film directors
Chinese male novelists
French-language writers from China